Osman Niyazi Burcu (1875 – 17 June 1955) was a Turkish Kemalist politician, and a prominent member of the CHP.

References 

1875 births
1955 deaths
Place of death missing
People from Balıkesir
Republican People's Party (Turkey) politicians